Mount Chirripó is the highest mountain in Costa Rica, with an elevation of 3,821 meters (12,536 feet). It is part of the Cordillera de Talamanca, and the range's highest point. It is located in Chirripó National Park and is noted for its ecological wealth. The mountain was named "Chirripo", meaning "land of eternal waters", by indigenous Costa Ricans because there are many lakes and streams around the mountain. The high peaks in Chirripó National Park and La Amistad International Park host important areas of Talamancan montane forest and Costa Rican Páramo with high endemism and extremely high biodiversity. The peaks of these mountains constitute sky islands for many species of plants and animals. Snow has not fallen on the peak in the past 100 years or so, according to the University of Costa Rica, but hail is sometimes reported.

On clear days it is possible to see across the country from the Pacific Ocean to the Caribbean Sea.

Climbing Mount Chirripó is possible by obtaining a permit from the National Park office in San Gerardo de Rivas. From the trailhead, the summit can be reached via a 19.5-kilometer (12.1 mile) hike.

Temperatures on the peak range from 4˚C to 18˚C in the daytime and can drop below freezing at night.

History
The earliest known civilization to inhabit the area of Chirripó was the indigenous Cabécar people. In 1904, Agustín Blessing Presinger became the first known European to climb the peak.

The first official hiking trail was constructed in 1965; it led to a small sheet-metal hut five kilometers away from the peak. Today, the hut has been replaced by a concrete building visited by 7,000 people each year. In 1975, Chirripó National Park was founded, enclosing and protecting 500 square kilometers of rain forest and mountains around the peak.

Since 1953, there have been five major wildfires in the area. Forest fires occurred in 1976, in the 1990s, and in 2012.

Route
The hike starts 1,500 meters above sea level in the village of San Gerardo in the Talamanca Range. From the valley, the path rises through fields and woodlands before ascending through lush rainforest. The forest gradually turns into scrubland. The trail continuously ascends and descends through ridges and valleys until it reaches the final visitors' refuge at 3,392 meters. From the refuge, there is a remaining two hour hike. Once the last ridge is crossed, there is a remaining 200 meters of steep path. The summit is a 6-meter wide platform of rocks.

See also
Mountain peaks of North America
List of Ultras of Central America

References

External links

 "Chirripó Grande, Costa Rica" on Peakbagger
 Cerro Chirripó on SummitPost

Chirripo
Highest points of countries
Locations in Mesoamerican mythology